Blanche Baker is an American actress and filmmaker. She won an Emmy Award for Best Supporting Actress for her work in the television mini-series Holocaust. Baker is known for her role as Ginny Baker in Sixteen Candles; she also starred in the title role of Lolita on Broadway.
In 2012, she produced and starred in a film about Ruth Madoff titled Ruth Madoff Occupies Wall Street.

Early life and education
Born Blanche Garfein in New York City, she is the daughter of actress Carroll Baker and director Jack Garfein. Her father is a Jew from Carpathian Ruthenia (born in Mukachevo), who survived the Holocaust; and her mother was a Roman Catholic who converted to Judaism. She also has a younger brother, Herschel Garfein. She spent her early life in Italy, where her mother had established a film career after leaving Hollywood in the mid-1960s. Baker attended the American School in Rome and then Wellesley College from 1974 to 1976, and later studied acting at the Herbert Berghof Studio and the Lee Strasberg Theatre Institute.

Career

Television
Blanche Baker made her television debut playing the character Anna Weiss in the miniseries Holocaust. (Her father Jack Garfein was a Holocaust survivor who had been imprisoned in Auschwitz.) She won the Emmy Award for Outstanding Single Performance by a Supporting Actress in a Comedy or Drama Series in 1978 for her performance.

She has subsequently appeared in the TV movies Mary and Joseph: A Story of Faith (1979) as Mary, The Day the Bubble Burst (1982), The Awakening of Candra (1983) as Candra Torres, Embassy (1985), Nobody's Child (1986), and Taking Chance (2009). She also has appeared on many TV series.

Theatre

In 1980–81, she originated the lead role in Edward Albee's stage adaptation of Vladimir Nabokov's novel Lolita. During out-of-town tryouts and in New York, the play was picketed by feminists, including Women Against Pornography, who were outraged by the theme of pedophilia.

The troubled production opened on Broadway on March 19, 1981, after 31 previews and closed after only 12 performances. Frank Rich of The New York Times gave the play a bad review, terming it "the kind of embarrassment that audiences do not quickly forget or forgive." Baker was mentioned by Rich in only one line. "In the title role, here a minor figure, the 24-year-old Miss Baker does a clever job of impersonating the downy nymphet; she deserves a more substantial stage vehicle soon."

People Magazine called Albee's Lolita "Broadway's Bomb of the Year" in an April 16, 1981, story. Baker was the real subject of the article, and People writer Mark Donovan said "the critics were almost unanimous on one point: Blanche Baker was an ingenue whose time had come," citing reviews of critics that had called her "breathtaking" and "beguiling."

Baker originated the role of Shelby in the first production of Steel Magnolias Off-Broadway in 1987.

Film
Baker made her movie debut in The Seduction of Joe Tynan (1979). Other film appearances include Sixteen Candles (1984), Cold Feet (1984) and Taking Chance (2009).

Personal life 
Baker married movie director Bruce vanDusen on October 1, 1983. They had three children before divorcing in 2002.

Baker remarried in 2003, to Mark McGill. They have one son.

Filmography

As director
 2017 - Streetwrite
 2019 - Make America Safe

References

External links

Actresses from New York City
American film actresses
American people of Czech-Jewish descent
American stage actresses
American television actresses
Jewish American actresses
Living people
Emmy Award winners
Primetime Emmy Award winners
Wellesley College alumni
Lee Strasberg Theatre and Film Institute alumni
20th-century American actresses
21st-century American actresses
21st-century American Jews
Year of birth missing (living people)